Mostafa Salehi Nejad is an Iranian football player who currently plays for Paykan in Iran's Premier Football League.

Club career

Club career statistics
Last Update  19 October 2010 

 Assist Goals

External links
Persian League Profile

Iranian footballers
Association football midfielders
Zob Ahan Esfahan F.C. players
Persian Gulf Pro League players
Sportspeople from Isfahan
Living people
1981 births